Zechariah Mendel ben Aryeh Leib (died c.1706) (Hebrew: זכריה מנדל בן אריה ליב) was a Polish Talmudist, native of Cracow. In 1689 he became chief rabbi and head of the yeshivah at Belz, Galicia.

He was the author of Be'er Heitev, a well-known commentary on the Shulchan Aruch, Yoreh De'ah, and Ḥoshen Mishpaṭ (first edition of the first part, Amsterdam, 1754; of the second, ib. 1764); the work is principally a compendium of the Sifte Kohen and Ṭure Zahav.

His descendants include Rebbetzin Malka Rokeach of Belz.

References

 Its bibliography:
Azulai, Shem ha-Gedolim, ii., s.v. Be'er Heṭeb;
Fuenn, Keneset Yisrael, p. 318.</ref>

18th-century Polish–Lithuanian rabbis
Rabbis from Kraków
Polish Orthodox rabbis